Together is a jazz album by the American guitarists Larry Coryell and Emily Remler, which was released by Concord Jazz in 1985.  They recorded it directly to two track that same year.

Reception

AllMusic awarded the album with 4.5 stars. Its review by Scott Yanow states: "This interesting and one-time matchup features Larry Coryell and Emily Remler on a set of guitar duets. It is easy to tell the two players apart, yet their styles were quite complementary. Highlights of the date (which has four standards, Pat Martino's "Gerri's Blues" and two Coryell originals) include "Joy Spring", "How My Heart Sings" and "How Insensitive".

At The Penguin Guide to Jazz, reviewers Richard Cook and Brian Morton says: "'Together' delivers fulsomely, a warm, approachable album which does not lack for subtleties. Recommended".

Leonard Feather, writing for the Los Angeles Times, called the album "the best guitar duo album of the year," and stated that "Coryell and Remler interact brilliantly."

Gear Diary's Michael Anderson commented: "The best thing for me is that their instrumental voices are unique but complementary; there is no ego here as the two swap back and forth and play supportively throughout. Great listening for any occasion."

Track listing
"Arubian Nights" (Larry Coryell) – 5:50
"Joy Spring" (Clifford Brown) – 5:44
"Ill Wind" (Harold Arlen, Ted Koehler) – 6:27
"How My Heart Sings" (Earl Zindars) – 5:43
"Six Beats, Six Strings" (Coryell) – 6:57
"Gerri’s Blues" (Pat Martino) – 5:29
"How Insensitive" (Antônio Carlos Jobim, Norman Gimbel) – 8:27

Personnel
Larry Coryell – electric guitar (Gibson Super 400 circa 1967) and acoustic guitar (Ovation Adamas)
Emily Remler – electric guitar (Borys) and acoustic guitar (Ovation Adamas)

References 

1985 albums
Larry Coryell albums
Emily Remler albums
Albums produced by Carl Jefferson
Concord Records albums
Collaborative albums